Raiganj Surendranath Mahavidyalaya is a college in Raiganj in the Uttar Dinajpur district of West Bengal, India. The college is affiliated to University of Gour Banga, offering undergraduate courses.

History 
On 10 October 1986 Ad hoc Governing Body decided to open a college in Raiganj. In November 1986 the institution was officially established and Dr. Dhrendra Kumar Das joined as first principal of the college.

Departments

Science

Chemistry 
Physics 
Mathematics
Botany
Zoology
Statistics

Arts

Bengali 
English
History
Geography
Political Science
Sociology
Education
Economics
Philosophy

Accreditation
In 2019 the college was awarded a B+ grade by the National Assessment and Accreditation Council (NAAC). The college is also recognized by the University Grants Commission (UGC).

See also

References

External links 
 http://www.rsmraiganj.in
University of Gour Banga
University Grants Commission
National Assessment and Accreditation Council

Colleges affiliated to University of Gour Banga
Academic institutions formerly affiliated with the University of North Bengal
Educational institutions established in 1986
Universities and colleges in Uttar Dinajpur district
1986 establishments in West Bengal
Raiganj